The Historical Society of the Northern Territory is a historical society founded in Darwin, Australia in 1964. Major objectives of the Society include (1) the study of the history of the Northern Territory of Australia; (2) encouraging the preservation of the Northern Territory's historical relics and records by their deposit with an appropriate national or local authority, but not with the Society (which does not maintain archives or collections); (3) promoting lectures, discussions, excursions and exhibitions relating to the history of the Northern Territory; and (4) providing an avenue for publishing on the history of the Northern Territory in the Society's journal or as an occasional paper or book.

The Society works with other historical societies and cultural organisations to advocate on behalf of the sector and to provide leadership and guidance.

The Society is the Northern Territory constituent member of the Federation of Australian Historical Societies

History
The Society was formed in Darwin in 1964.

Publications
The Society publishes a journal, newsletter and other publications.

References

External links
 Historical Society of the Northern Territory official website

History of the Northern Territory
Educational organisations based in Australia
Non-profit organisations based in the Northern Territory
Organizations established in 1964
Historical societies of Australia